Felipe de Jesús Cantú Rodríguez (born 9 May 1966) is a Mexican politician from the National Action Party. He has served as Deputy of the LVII and LXI Legislatures of the Mexican Congress representing Nuevo León. He also served as Mayor of Monterrey from 2000 to 2003.

Gubernatorial election

In February 2015 Cantú Rodríguez won the PAN primaries in the state the Nuevo León defeating candidate Margarita Arellanes who began the internal race as the favorite. Cantu officially became the PAN candidate for the 2015 Nuevo León Guvernatorial election

References

1966 births
Living people
Politicians from Monterrey
National Action Party (Mexico) politicians
Municipal presidents of Monterrey
21st-century Mexican politicians
Members of the Chamber of Deputies (Mexico) for Nuevo León